Major-General Eric George William Warde Harrison, CB, CBE, MC, (23 March 1893 – 20 December 1987) was a British Army officer who served in both world wars, a rugby player, Olympic athlete, and later a painter and author.

Military career
Harrison was born in Belgaum, India; his father, Major WC Warde Harrison, was an officer in the British Indian Army. Harrison was educated at Cheltenham College before entering Royal Military Academy, Woolwich. While at Woolwich he played competitive rugby union for the army and for Kent and was selected by the Barbarians. From Woolwich he was commissioned into the Royal Garrison Artillery as a second lieutenant on 19 December 1913, after which he was invited to play football for Southend United F.C. He took up hurdling and was soon selected to compete for England in the 120 metres hurdles against Scotland and Ireland.

First World War
At the outbreak of the First World War, in August 1914, Harrison was posted first to Harwich, manning anti-aircraft guns, and then to France, where he was involved in intense fighting around Hooge. He was awarded the Military Cross (MC) in March 1915, the citation for which reads:

He was promoted to lieutenant in June, and went on to fight at the Battle of Loos. He was promoted again, this time to the temporary rank of captain, in November 1916, a promotion which was made permanent a year later. In 1918 he was promoted to brevet major, making him the youngest officer in the army to hold the rank at the time, and given command of an infantry school before appointment as a general staff officer first grade. By the end of the First World War, Harrison was attached to the 58th (London) Division and had been mentioned in dispatches four times.

Between the wars
Following the end of the war, Harrison resumed his sports careers. He was selected for the "Mother Country" rugby team (forerunner to the British and Irish Lions) in 1919, and played for the army against Oxford University in 1920. Harrison's rugby career ended prematurely due to injury, after which he refocused on hurdling; he was selected for the 1920 Summer Olympics but was prohibited from competing due to heart problems. He was appointed master of the Royal Artillery Harriers and then selected for staff college. He went on to compete at the 1924 Summer Olympics in Paris, and reached a semi-final in the 110 metres hurdles. After the Olympics, Harrison attended the Staff College, Camberley from 1925 to 1926 and was appointed adjutant to Lahore District, India, from 1928 to 1932. There he became master of the Lahore Hunt and took up big game shooting and racquets, in which he won the doubles event at the All India Championships. He returned to England in 1932, when he was promoted to permanent major. In 1934, Harrison was appointed a battery commander at Catterick Garrison in Yorkshire. Here he began painting, and eventually had three of his works hung at the Salon in Paris. Later that year, he was promoted to brevet lieutenant colonel and given command of the Oxford University Officer Training Corps (OTC) and lectured at the university on military history until he relinquished the post in 1938; he also became master of the South Oxfordshire Hunt.

In 1939, Harrison briefly served in Mandatory Palestine, commanding an infantry battalion at the end of the Arab Revolt under Major-General Bernard Montgomery, General Officer Commanding (GOC) 8th Infantry Division and a former Staff College instructor, who remarked that, "having loosed 'Dreadnought Harrison' on the task of killing rebels [...] he needed no urging in this respect". On 22 July 1939 Harrison was promoted to lieutenant colonel.

Second World War
With the outbreak of the Second World War in September 1939, Harrison returned to England and was appointed Commander, Royal Artillery (CRA) with the 12th (Eastern) Infantry Division, based at Sevenoaks in Kent. Harrison was promoted to full colonel on 28 August 1939 (with seniority backdated to 1 January 1937), and, on the same date, to the temporary rank of brigadier. The 12th Division was sent overseas to France in April 1940 but left its artillery, and Harrison, behind. Severely mauled during the Battle of France the following month, the 12th Division was disbanded in July and Harrison became Brigadier, Royal Artillery (BRA) in Northern Ireland District before being posted to Tunisia, where he served as Commander, Corps of Royal Artillery (CCRA) in IX Corps, under, initially, Lieutenant-General John Crocker, and, from late April 1943, Lieutenant-General Brian Horrocks. After the end of the campaign, Harrison was promoted to major general and served in General Dwight D. Eisenhower's Allied Forces Headquarters (AFHQ) as Major General, Royal Artillery (MGRA); he was mentioned in despatches for his service during the Allied invasion of Sicily and continued in the post until 1943, when he returned to Britain to become General Officer Commanding (GOC) Sussex and Surrey District. Harrison was made a Commander of the Order of the British Empire (OBE) on 5 August 1943, and was promoted on 4 December 1943 to acting major-general. His rank of major-general was made temporary on 4 December 1944. He was made a Companion of the Order of the Bath (CB) in 1945, and appointed aide-de-camp to King George VI in 1945, and retired from the army on 28 May 1946, having been granted the honorary permanent rank of major general.

Retirement
In retirement, Harrison lived in Cornwall. He became master of the North Cornwall Hounds and was appointed Deputy Lieutenant of Cornwall in 1955 and then High Sheriff of Cornwall in 1958. He also served as a justice of the peace, and chairman of St Lawrence's Hospital in Bodmin. In spare time, he grew rhododendrons and bred Labrador Retrievers, and fished for trout. He also published three books, including an autobiography, Gunners, Game & Gardens. His wife, Roza (née Stevenson), died in 1967. Harrison himself died in Amesbury, Wiltshire, on 20 December 1987 at the age of 94.

Legacy
The National Portrait Gallery holds five photographic portraits of Harrison, three by Walter Stoneman from 1945 and two by Bassano Ltd from 1947.

Publications

References

General

Specific

External links
Generals of World War II

1893 births
1987 deaths
Athletes (track and field) at the 1924 Summer Olympics
British Army major generals
British Army generals of World War II
British Army personnel of World War I
British autobiographers
British military personnel of the 1936–1939 Arab revolt in Palestine
British non-fiction writers
Commanders of the Order of the British Empire
Companions of the Order of the Bath
Deputy Lieutenants of Cornwall
English footballers
English male hurdlers
English rugby union players
Graduates of the Royal Military Academy, Woolwich
Graduates of the Staff College, Camberley
High Sheriffs of Cornwall
Military personnel of British India
Olympic athletes of Great Britain
People educated at Cheltenham College
Recipients of the Military Cross
Royal Artillery officers
Royal Garrison Artillery officers
Southend United F.C. players
Association footballers not categorized by position
20th-century non-fiction writers